Tessa Davies (1940 – 1 June 1988) was an English set decorator. She carried the suffix MCSD as she was a member of the Chartered Society of Designers. She was nominated for an Academy Award in the category Best Art Direction for the film Yentl. She was bludgeoned to death.

Selected filmography
 Yentl (1983)

References

External links

1940 births
1988 deaths
1988 murders in the United Kingdom
English murder victims
English set decorators
Female murder victims
People murdered in England
Violence against women in England